Bombus expolitus is a species of cuckoo bumblebee.

References 

Bumblebees
Insects described in 1989